Patola may refer to:

 Patola cloth, a double ikat, usually silk, from Gujarat, western India
 Patola (1973 film), an Indian Punjabi language film
 Patola (1987 film), an Indian Punjabi language film
 Luffa species (Philippine usage)
 Trichosanthes cucumerina (Sinhalese usage)
 Trichosanthes dioica (Portuguese usage)
 Patola, Helsinki, a district of Helsinki, Finland
 Patola, an Indian Punjabi language track sung by  Bohemia and Guru Randhawa